The Billingsley Report is a college football rating system developed in the late 1960s to determine a national champion.  Billingsley has actively rated college football teams on a current basis since 1970. Beginning in 1999, Billingsley's ratings were included as one of seven mathematical formulas included in the Bowl Championship Series (BCS) rankings.

Unlike the other mathematical formulas included in the BCS rankings, the Billingsley Report was not prepared by a trained mathematician or statistician. Instead, the Billingsley Report is prepared by Richard Billingsley (born c. 1951), a lifelong college football fan in Hugo, Oklahoma.  Billingsley attended Texas Bible College, became a minister and later a consultant in the country music business.  He began preparing his own weekly college football ratings as a hobby.

Billingsley has also applied his ratings methodology retroactively to select national champions for each year from 1869 to 1870 and from 1872 to 1969.  Since 1996, the "Billingsley Report" has been one of the selectors of historic national champions recognized by the National Collegiate Athletic Association (NCAA) in its Football Bowl Subdivision record book.

The NCAA describes Billingsley's methodology as follows: " The main feature of his system is the inclusion of a unique rule for head-to-head competition, with the overall system consisting of a balanced approach to wins, losses, strength of schedule, and home-field advantage. A slight weight is given to most recent performance. The Billingsley formula does not use margin of victory, however, the Billingsley MOV formula does include margin of victory in the calculations."

Richard Billingsley is also the owner of the College Football Research Center.

Billingsley Report national champions
The following list identifies the college football national champions as selected by the Billingsley Report.  Billingsley uses an alternate methodology which includes margin of victory in the calculations. Where the latter methodology results in a different champion, the alternate national champion is listed with the notation "Billingsley MOV".

See also
NCAA Division I FBS national football championship

References

College football championships
College football awards organizations